Korolyovo is a rural locality (a village) in Krasavino Urban Settlement, Velikoustyugsky District, Vologda Oblast, Russia. The population was 4 as of 2002.

Geography 
The distance to Veliky Ustyug is 25 km, to Krasavino is 1.9 km. Krasavino is the nearest rural locality.

References 

Rural localities in Velikoustyugsky District